USS Jimmy Carter (SSN-23) is the third and final  nuclear-powered fast-attack submarine in the United States Navy. Commissioned in 2005, she is named for the 39th president of the United States, Jimmy Carter, the only president to have qualified on submarines. The only submarine to be named for a living president, Jimmy Carter is also one of the few vessels, and only the third submarine of the US Navy, to be named for a living person. Extensively modified from the original design of her class, she is sometimes described as a subclass unto herself.

History

Construction
The contract to build Jimmy Carter was awarded to the Electric Boat Division of General Dynamics Corporation in Groton, Connecticut on 29 June 1996, and her keel was laid on 5 December 1998. Original schedules called for Jimmy Carter to be commissioned in late 2001 or early 2002. During modification, her hull was extended  to create a 2,500-ton supplementary middle section which forms a Multi-Mission Platform (MMP). This section is fitted with an ocean interface for divers, remotely operated vehicles (ROVs), and special operation equipment; ROV handling system, storage, and deployment space for mission systems, and a pressure-resistant passage between the fore and aft parts of the submarine to accommodate the boat's crew.

Jimmy Carter was christened on 5 June 2004, and the ship sponsor was former First Lady Rosalynn Carter.

Jimmy Carter has additional maneuvering devices fitted fore and aft that allow her to keep station over selected targets in odd currents. Intelligence experts speculate that the MMP may find use in missions as an underwater splicing chamber for optical fiber cables.

Deployments
On 19 November 2004 Jimmy Carter completed alpha sea trials, her first voyage in the open seas. On 22 December, Electric Boat delivered Jimmy Carter to the US Navy, and she was commissioned 19 February 2005 at NSB New London.

Jimmy Carter began a transit from NSB New London to her new homeport at the Bangor Annex of Naval Base Kitsap, Washington on 14 October 2005 but was forced to return when an unusually high wave caused damage while the submarine was running on the surface. The damage was repaired and Jimmy Carter left New London the following day, arriving at Bangor the afternoon of 9 November 2005.

In April and September 2017 Jimmy Carter returned twice to her homeport at Naval Base Kitsap-Bangor, flying a Jolly Roger flag, traditionally indicative of a successful mission.

Awards
2007 Battle Efficiency Award, commonly known as a "Battle E".
2012 Battle Efficiency Award.
2013 Presidential Unit Citation

Gallery

See also
USS Parche

References

External links

 
 Navy Commissions USS Jimmy Carter , from the Navy's Commander Submarine Group Two website
 USS Jimmy Carter: Expanding Future SSN Missions
 oralhistoryproject.com: World War II Submarine Veterans History Project
 NavSource Online: USS Jimmy Carter (SSN-23)
 USS Jimmy Carter Multi-Mission Platform, in PDF format
 James Bamford Inside the National Security Agency (Lecture) American Civil Liberties Union KUOW-FM PRX NPR 24 February 2007 (53: minutes)
 Big Brother Is Listening by James Bamford The Atlantic April 2006

 

2004 ships
Submarines of the United States
Carter
Espionage devices
Espionage techniques
Nuclear submarines of the United States Navy
Seawolf-class submarines
Ships built in Groton, Connecticut